Hispar Glacier is a  long glacier in the Karakoram Mountains of Gilgit–Baltistan, Pakistan which meets the  long Biafo Glacier at the Hispar La (Pass) at an altitude of  to create the world's longest glacial system outside of the polar regions.

Details
This  highway of ice connects two ancient mountain kingdoms, Nagar in the west with Baltistan in the east. The extreme steepness of the hillsides and strenuous nature of the boulder hopping on the lateral moraines and hillsides make this route's upper half the most difficult part of the Biafo - Hispar traverse. Only the Hispar La day includes walking on the Hispar Glacier.  The crossing of four major tributary glaciers from the north is most taxing, and potentially high nullah crossings can be dangerous.  The views of  peaks and of the snow-covered cliffs and mountains on the south side of the glacier are particularly impressive.

Rivers
The Hispar River, a tributary of the Hunza River, rises from the meltwater of the glacier.

See also
Central Karakoram National Park
List of mountains in Pakistan
List of highest mountains
List of longest glaciers
Hispar Muztagh

References

External links
 Northern Pakistan detailed placemarks in Google Earth

Glaciers of Gilgit-Baltistan
Glaciers of the Karakoram